CGS-9896 is an anxiolytic drug used in scientific research. It has similar effects to benzodiazepine drugs but is structurally distinct and so is classed as a nonbenzodiazepine anxiolytic.

CGS-9896 is a benzodiazepine receptor partial agonist which produces long-lasting anxiolytic and anticonvulsant effects in animal studies but does not produce sedative effects. It also increases appetite, and reduces the development of gastrointestinal ulcers following chronic stress.

References 

Anxiolytics
Pyrazoloquinolines
Lactams
Chloroarenes
GABAA receptor positive allosteric modulators
Experimental drugs